Vojtěch Bartoněk (March 28, 1859 - August 25, 1908 in Prague) was a Czech painter and art restorer.

Life and work
He studied at the Academy of Fine Arts, Prague; initially with Jan Swerts, later with Antonín Lhota, Maximilian Pirner, František Sequens and František Čermák. He completed his studies in Paris at the École des Beaux Arts.

Primarily known as a history painter, he later turned to genre scenes from the streets and marketplaces of Prague. In 1888, his painting "Recruits" was purchased by Josef Hlávka, benefactor of the Czech Academy of Sciences.

He collaborated with Mikoláš Aleš on the diorama,  (Killing the Saxons at ) and illustrated some of the works of  Božena Němcová. He also provided illustrations for Světozor and Zlatá Praha.

Several churches have altar paintings by him and were the beneficiaries of his restorative work.

References

External links

1859 births
1908 deaths
Artists from Prague
Academy of Fine Arts, Prague alumni
19th-century Czech painters
Czech male painters
Burials at Olšany Cemetery
19th-century Czech male artists